is a Japanese manga artist. She debuted in 1994 in Shogakukan's Shōjo Comic with "Anata no Iro ni Somaritai". She continued writing for Shogakukan until 2007, with her works appearing in both Shōjo Comic and their other magazine Cheese!. She left the company to go freelance citing a dispute over working conditions and abusive treatment by her editor.

Professional career
Shinjo made her debut at publisher Shogakukan in 1994, drawing series for Shōjo Comic magazine. In 2007 she left the company, noting that her editors were excessively demanding and abusive, creating a stressful work environment.

In her blog, Shinjo noted that though she was the actual creator of her manga titles, she was one of the last to know about any adaptation plans for her series, even learning about some through TV channel websites instead of her editor. When she decided to leave, one editor threatened to take all of her earlier series out of print, but Shinjo contacted a lawyer and the threat was never carried out.

In a 2014 interview with Hikari TV's online magazine, Katte ni Dokusho Densetsu, Shinjo announced her plans to no longer write shojo manga and instead to only focus on writing BL manga.

Bibliography
Dates listed are dates for original serialization.

 (1995) 
 (1996) 
 (1996) 
 (1997) ; English translation: Sensual Phrase
 (2001) 
 (2003-2004) 
 (2002-2004) 
 (2005) The Poisonous Flower
 (2004-2006) ; English translation: Love Celeb
 (2006-2007) 
 (2006-2007) SEX=LOVE2
 (2008) Midnight Children
 (2008–2011) , English translation: Ai Ore: Love Me!
 (2008) Demon Love Spell
 (2009) Apple
 (2009) 
 (2010) Goshimeidesu

Next:

 After School Wedding
 Anata ni tsunagaretai (I want to be tied to you)
 Anata no Iro ni Somarita (I want to dye myself your color)
 Chou Ai Strip (Lavish Love Strip)
 City Romance (Short Story)
 Dame Ijiwaru H
 Dakishimete tokashite
 Doting Love Strip
 Haou Airen (Supreme King of Lovers or Despotic Lover)
 Hokenshitsu no My Darling
 Itai Ai
 I want to be a Fiancée
 Junai Strip (Honest Love Strip)
 Kinenbi tokubetsuna H
 Motto Oshiete (Teach Me More)
 Senpai amasugiru 
 Side Seat Daite (Embrace me on the side seat)
 Summer Days 17
 Shonen no Susume
 TABOO ni Daite (Embraced by Taboo)
 Yasashiku mitene
 Zakuro no Mi wo abaite
 NEW!! The Poisonous Flower

References

External links
 

 
1973 births
Japanese female comics artists
Female comics writers
Living people
Women manga artists
Manga artists from Nagasaki Prefecture
Japanese women writers